Boyeria vinosa, the fawn darner,  is a species of dragonfly in the family Aeshnidae. It is found in south-eastern Canada and eastern USA.  Its natural habitat is rivers. They are most active at dusk.

References 

Aeshnidae
Insects of North America
Insects described in 1839